Eugene Miller is a former member of Cleveland City Council and a former member of the Ohio House of Representatives, representing the 10th District from 2007 to 2009. He has represented Cleveland's Ward 10 since May 2009, when he was appointed to complete the unexpired term of Councilman Roosevelt Coats. He won an election for the seat in November 2009.

References

External links
Page on Cleveland City Council website

Living people
Year of birth missing (living people)
African-American state legislators in Ohio
Cleveland City Council members
Democratic Party members of the Ohio House of Representatives
Politicians from Cleveland
2008 United States presidential electors
Baldwin Wallace University alumni
21st-century American politicians
21st-century African-American politicians